Vakkeel Vasudev is a 1993 Indian Malayalam film, directed by P. G. Vishwambharan, starring Jagadish, Jayaram and Sunitha in the lead roles.

Plot
The movie deals with the consequences of alcoholism in the lives of two individuals belonging to two different poles of the society. The movie starts with the typical story of a common man. His name is Thankappan (Krishnankutty Nair) a lineman employed with the Electricity Board. His family consists of his wife and two daughters, Jayasree & Sreedevi . He is very fond of having booze sessions after his work time which is encouraged by his wife. Then the story shifts to the office of an acclaimed lawyer named Vasudev. He mainly deals with litigations related to motor accident insurances, he takes up latter cases and obtains a lion's share of the insurance claim as his fee.

Next character is a rich bachelor named, Vishnu (Jayaram), he comes from the United States to his home in Kerala. Thomaskutty (Jagathy Sreekumar), an aid of Vishnu at Kerala is his main accomplice. Vishnu, accompanied by Thomas are frequent visitors to numerous bars and drinks excessively each day. On an ill-fated night, an inebriated Vishnu rams his car on a drunk Thankappan, which kills the latter. They hide the car and Vishnu being guilty conscious of his reckless act decides to financially assist Thankappan's family. The rest of the story revolves around twists revealing the truth behind the accident. Both Vishnu and Vasudev have a romantic interest on Thankappan's elder daughter Sreedevi. While Sreedevi reciprocates Vishnu's feelings.

After some humorous instances Sub Inspector Jabbar (Mamukoya) arrests Vishnu and Thomas. Finally Vasudev understands the innocence of Vishnu, as it is revealed that, another car rammed on Thankappan after Vishnu's hit. The ownership of the car is in Vasudev's name which startles Vishnu. Later it is known that, the car was sold to Stephen (Riza Bava)by Vasudev, which proves Stephen is the main culprit.

Cast
 Jagadish as Advocate Vasudev
 Jayaram as Vishnu
 Sunitha as Sreedevi
 Jagathy Sreekumar as Thomaskutty
 KPAC Lalitha as Bhavani
 Geetha Vijayan as Shobha
 Mala Aravindan as Narayanan
 Mamukkoya	as SI Jabbar
 Bobby Kottarakkara as Lambodharan
 Krishnankutty Nair as Current Thankappan
 Harishree Ashokan as Vasu
 Rizabawa as Stephen d'Souza
 T. P. Madhavan as Mathai
 Kunchan
 Thodupuzha Vasanthy as Janu
 Baiju as Lalu

Box office
The film was a commercial success.

References

External links
 

1993 films
1990s Malayalam-language films
Films directed by P. G. Viswambharan
Films scored by Mohan Sithara